Anke Petermann born in Hagen-Hohenlimburg is a German Germanist, Romanist, independent broadcast journalist and country correspondent in Rhineland-Palatinate out Mainz for the Germany broadcast station (Deutschlandfunk).

Life 
Petermann studied languages in Perugia and Grove and at the Westfälische Wilhelms University German studies, Romance languages and literature and Skandinavistik.  As a freelancer she wrote for the Iserlohner Kreisanzeiger newspaper, from 1992 followed a traineeship at RIAS in Berlin, later she was a reporter and presenter of German language programs Voice of America in Washington, D.C. and came back to RIAS as an editor from Magdeburg. Since 1994 she is a freelance correspondent for the Deutschlandfunk, initially from Saxony-Anhalt, since 2001 from Rhineland-Palatinate and Hesse. For the Heinrich Boell Foundation she wrote in 2015 and 2016.

She is the author and cocontributor of 33 episodes of the daily at 06:30 pm magazine background on Deutschlandfunk and other broadcasts..

References 

Living people
German radio journalists
German women journalists
Year of birth missing (living people)